The Ravenswood Post (1953–1981), was an African-American weekly newspaper published by Clarence A. Burley in Menlo Park, California, and served the communities of East Menlo Park (or Belle Haven) and East Palo Alto, California. In the 1970s, Jym Marks was a columnist for the paper. 

Other local news publishings included the newspaper, East Palo Alto Today; former newspaper, The Peninsula Bulletin; and the magazine, El Ravenswood.

See also 
 List of African-American newspapers in California

References 

Defunct African-American newspapers
Defunct newspapers published in California
1953 establishments in California
1981 disestablishments in California
Newspapers published in the San Francisco Bay Area
Newspapers established in 1953
Publications disestablished in 1981
Weekly newspapers published in California